St. Mary Square is a small square in Timișoara, located in the Iosefin district, at the intersection of 16 December 1989 Boulevard (former Carol I Boulevard) and Gheorghe Doja Street (former General Gheorghe Domășnean Street). It is part of the urban site Old Iosefin, classified as a historic monument. According to local tradition, Gheorghe Doja, the leader of the peasant uprising of 1514, was martyred here. Also here took place the first anti-communist demonstrations in Timișoara in 1989, demonstrations that would ignite the Romanian Revolution.

References 

Squares in Timișoara